Bock is a type of strong lager originating from Germany.

Bock may also refer to:

 Super Bock, a Portuguese brand of strong pale lager
 Bock (bagpipe), a type of bellows-blown bagpipe native to Germany, Austria, and Bohemia
 Bote & Bock, a German publishing house

People 
 Bock (footballer), the nickname of a retired Portuguese professional footballer
 Bock (surname), or Böck, surnames

Places 
 Bock (Luxembourg), a fortified promontory in Luxembourg City
 Bock, Minnesota, a small city in the United States
 Bock (island), a German island in the Baltic Sea

See also 
 Bach (disambiguation)